Meridan State College is a state school governed by the Department of Education (Queensland) located at 214 Parklands Boulevard, Meridan Plains, Caloundra, Queensland, Australia. The school was founded in 2006 for students from pre-school to year 7, and in 2008 it opened to be available to years 7-9, 10 and 11 in 2010, and year 12 in 2012. Meridan State College is now a full Prep-Year 12 school.

School awards 
In November, 2015, Meridan State College received the Jack Pizzey School of the Year Award. This award no longer exists.

Sessions 
Bell times are different for Primary and Secondary students. 
Secondary sessions are 70 minutes long, with 2 lunch breaks, on days other than Tuesday.

Sporting communities 
Meridan State College has four sporting houses (referred to as "communities") within the school. These communities are named after Australian athletes.

References

External links

Public high schools in Queensland
Caloundra
Educational institutions established in 2006
2006 establishments in Australia